Periboeum is a genus of beetles in the family Cerambycidae, containing the following species:

 Periboeum acuminatum (Thomson, 1860)
 Periboeum aduncum Napp & Martins, 1984
 Periboeum atylodes Salvador, 1978
 Periboeum bolivianum Martins & Monné, 1975
 Periboeum dilectum Napp & Martins, 1984
 Periboeum guttigerum Napp & Martins, 1984
 Periboeum maculatum Magno, 1987
 Periboeum metallicum Magno, 1987
 Periboeum obscuricorne Martins & Monné, 1975
 Periboeum ocellatum Gounelle, 1909
 Periboeum paraense Napp & Martins, 1984
 Periboeum paucispinum (Lameere, 1890)
 Periboeum piliferum (Erichson, 1847)
 Periboeum pubescens (Olivier, 1790)
 Periboeum spinosum Galileo & Martins, 2010
 Periboeum terminatum (Perroud, 1855)
 Periboeum umbrosum Gounelle, 1909
 Periboeum vicinum (Perroud, 1855)

References

Elaphidiini